Relación breve de la conquista de la Nueva España is the account of friar Francisco de Aguilar, who in his youth took part in the Spanish conquest of the Aztec Empire as a conquistador under the command of Hernán Cortés.

According to the introduction by the author, the account was written after Aguilar had joined the Dominican Order, at a time in which he would have been more than 80 years old, between 1559 and 1571. Following the death of Francisco de Aguilar, the manuscript came into the possession of the Viceroyalty of New Spain and the Roman Catholic Archdiocese of Mexico Pedro Moya de Contreras, who then gave it to Philip II of Spain. Since then, the Relación breve de la conquista de la Nueva España has been held along with other 16th century manuscripts in the library of the Royal Site of San Lorenzo de El Escorial. The manuscript survived a fire in the library that occurred on 7 June 1671.

Publication History 
In 1892, the Mexican historian Francisco del Paso y Troncoso, managed to obtain a copy of “Relación breve de la conquista de la Nueva España”. This same copy was then used by fellow Mexican historian Luis González Obregón, who included it in his Anales del Museo nacional de México, t. VIII (1ª. época ), entrega 1ª.,, under the title Historia de la Nueva España, in June 1900.

The text was modernized by Alfonso Teja Zabre, and released under the title Historia de la Nueva España, in November 1937. The editor refers to Francisco de Aguilar as Alonso de Aguilar; because according to Mexican historian José Luis Martínez, Aguilar changed his name when he joined the Dominican Order. This edition was republished in 1938 by the publisher Botas. En 1943, the publisher Vargas Rea again republished the work, this time under the title Relato breve de la conquista de la Nueva España .

In 1954 Federico Gómez de Orozco headed the publication of a new edition featuring an essay by Father Mariano Gutiérrez and a biography of the author written by Agustín Dávila Padilla. The edition was published under the title Relación breve de la conquista de la Nueva España, escrita por fray Francisco de Aguilar, de la orden de predicadores by the publisher José Porrúa e hijos.

In 1963, the edition by Gómez de Orozco was translated into English and published by Orion Press under the title The Chronicle of Fray Francisco de Aguilar, with a preface by Howard D. Cline.

In 1977, Jorge Gurría Lacroix included a facsimile of the original manuscript, the introductions of past editions, and a preliminary academic study, under the name Relación breve de la conquista de la Nueva España, in the collection Serie de historiadores y cronistas de Indias no.7, National Autonomous University of Mexico.

In 2002, Germán Vázquez Chamorro, released a compilation entitled Conquista de Tenochtitlan, which includes “Relación breve de la conquista de la Nueva España”.

See also 
 Historia verdadera de la conquista de la Nueva España
 Historia general de las Indias

References

Bibliography 
Martínez, José Luis (2005) Hernán Cortés (versión abreviada), Fondo de Cultura Económica, México, 
 Vázquez Chamorro, Germán (2003) La conquista de Tenochtitlan, colección Crónicas de América; compilación de J. Díaz, A. de Tapia, B. Vázquez, F. de Aguilar. “Relación breve de la conquista de la Nueva España” DASTIN S.L.

External links 
 artehistoria Junta de Castilla y León "Relación breve de la conquista de la Nueva España"

History of New Spain
Spanish-language literature about Mesoamerica
1560s books
16th-century history books
History books about the 16th  century
Spanish conquests in the Americas
Spanish colonization of the Americas
1560s in New Spain